Peter Cunnah (born 30 August 1966 in Derry, Northern Ireland) is a Northern Irish singer and lead singer and songwriter of 1990s dance-pop duo D:Ream.

D:Ream 

Prior to forming D:Ream, he was lead guitarist with Belfast-based band Tie the Boy, who were briefly signed to the Mother Records label, owned by U2. When that deal foundered soon after the band's move from Belfast to London, in-fighting amongst the members led rapidly to its split.

Finding himself in the heart of London's clubland, Cunnah, already a producer, originally conceived D:Ream as a way of re-using songs from his previous band. With little by way of support in London, he teamed up with DJ Al Mackenzie on a series of dance records by a 'faceless' dance act which would be fronted live and on-record by a diva, leaving Cunnah free to concentrate on songwriting and production and Mackenzie on building a DJ reputation.

However, after a live date when Cunnah stepped up to sing, he found himself enjoying the experience and rapidly remodelled the D:Ream concept around his own vocals. Initially performing as a duo, they received acclaim in clubs and found management and record and publishing deals.

Solo work 
Cunnah subsequently developed solo and collaborative material while working as a writer and producer behind the scenes, including singles and album tracks for the pop groups Steps and A1. He sang lead vocals on Chicane's 2003 single "Love on the Run", which reached No.33 in the United Kingdom and No.43 in Ireland. Cunnah also helped compose music for the anime InuYasha.

Cunnah returned to live performances with guitar-based band Shane, whose debut single "The Weight of This" was released in May 2006. Shane sees Cunnah going back to his roots. He has two old friends in the band – Paul Greendale on guitar and Mark Roberts on drums. Cunnah knew Roberts from their time in the rock band Tie The Boy. Cunnah has also produced the YouTube star Ben Kelly, a contestant on The Voice UK.

References

External links 
 www.d-ream.net: D:Ream's Official website
 EveryHit.com: UK Top 40 Database
 Paul Gambaccini, Tim Rice, Jonathan Rice (1995), UK Hit Singles, Guinness Publishing

1966 births
Living people
Musicians from Derry (city)
Male singers from Northern Ireland
Male songwriters from Northern Ireland
Record producers from Northern Ireland
People educated at St Columb's College